Sobohti (also Romanized as Sobohtī) is a village in Tiab Rural District, in the Central District of Minab County, Hormozgan Province, Iran. At the 2006 census, its population was 586, in 115 families.

References 

Populated places in Minab County